"I Wanna Know You" is a duet by Miley Cyrus and David Archuleta from the album Hannah Montana 3. The song was not released until its release with the album, Hannah Montana 3 and it was not until post-release that the song garnered success in the United States.

Background
The song was originally recorded as a solo by Miley Cyrus (as Hannah Montana) for the first season of the Disney Channel original series Hannah Montana. The song was then recorded as a duet between Montana and Archuleta in order to correspond with his guest appearance on the show, in which the song was used in the episode. Both versions of the song are featured on the show's third soundtrack, Hannah Montana 3.

Chart performance
The song did not garner success until post-release of Hannah Montana 3. The song peaked at number 74 on the Billboard Hot 100.

Charts

Release history

Credits and personnel
 Vocals – Miley Cyrus, David Archuleta
 Writer – Jeannie Lurie, Aris Archontis, Chen Neeman
 Producer – Archontis, Lurie, Neeman
 Mixer – Archontis

References

Songs from television series

External links

Hannah Montana songs
David Archuleta songs
2009 songs
Songs written by Jeannie Lurie
Songs written by Aris Archontis